Bernd Scholz (February 28, 1911 – September 22, 1969) was a German composer. His also assumed the pen name Klaus Textor for his popular compositions.

Scholz was born in Neustadt in Oberschlesien (now Prudnik). Even as a child he wished to become a composer, writing his first composition at age 12. After graduation, he went to Berlin where he studied German and music at the Akademie für Schul- und Kirchenmusik. His radio plays for the Berlin radio lead to film assignments including scores for the feature-length Nanga Parbat films of German expeditions in the Himalayas. He fought in the second world war and was held as a Soviet prisoner until 1950.

He returned to West Germany in 1950, married, had three children, and settled in Schliersee. He found employment in radio and television, working with the directors Lietzau, Beauvais, Düggelin, Schlechte, Westphal, and ten Haaf. He participated in the 1954 contemporary music festival in Donauschingen where his works were conducted by Hans Rosbaud (the same year when American composer John Cage's appearance became a legendary fiasco). He wrote his Japan Concerto for classical guitarist Siegfried Behrend and a large concerto for bandleader Willi Stech. He produced works for a festival of easy music, and his works were recorded and broadcast by all the major German broadcasters.

He is buried at the Schliersee cemetery.

Works 
Konzerte
Japanisches Konzert. Concerto for guitar and large orchestra. Premiered in Tokyo
Piano Concerto
Concertante for Winds. Premiered 1954 Donaueschingen Festival
Intrade
Japanische Regenmelodie
Kleine Melodie von anno dazumal
Kleine Serenade
Land-Liebe
Lebensraum
Lederhosen-Polka
Liebeswalzer
Lied Ohne Worte
Luftsprünge
März-Gebet
Mandolinetta
Medaillon
Mein Haar, Das Ist Mein Sturmhut
Melodie
Menuett
Merry Day
Mi ist ein schön's braun's Maidelein
Minara
Mir ist ein feins braunes Maidelein
Monopoli
Moritat von Anton Und Dorothee
Nymphenburger Miniatur
Olivia
Ouvertüre zu Einem Possenspiel
Ouvertüre zu Einer Harlekinade
Papagallo
Paradiso
Rummelplatz
Salzburger Spieluhr
Schillerndes Spiel
Schlesischer Kirmes-Dreher
Serenade
Serenata Melanconica
Serenata Piccolina
Siesta in Ibiza
Sommerlaune
Sommerwind
Sonate Nr.2
Sonatine
Sonatine D-Dur
Sonatine Für Flöte Und Klavier
Sonatine Für Unterhaltungsorchester
Suite Für Flöte Und Klavier
Suite Galante
Traum-Serenade
Türkische Barcarole
Verträumte Bucht
Wenn du an die Liebe glaubst
Westindia-Serenade
Xylophonetik

Works under the pen name Klaus Textor 
 Aus Grossmutters Salon-Album
 Angry-Swing
 Blue Dark-Blues
 Candlelight-Blues
 Der Jongleur-Fox
 Der Traum des Zirkusreiters
 Fiesta-Mambo
 Gay Play
 Glasmosaik
 Gluecksklee
 Happiness-Fox
 Hund und Katze
 Ich Finde die Liebe sentimental
 In der Bucht Von Riva
 In der Toscana
 Irrlichter
 Kleine Strassenmelodie
 Kleiner Konzertwalzer
 Lied im Schilf
 Lolita-Fox
 Mi ist ein rot Goldringelein
 Mimosen-Tango
 Mistral
 Morgens in der Fruehe
 Novella Amorosa
 Nudelbrett-Polka
 Party-Bummel
 Ping-Pong
 Pulli-Rock
 Roulette
 Rundherum-Polka
 Schmollwinkel-Polka
 Seifenblasen
 Spaziergang am See
 Staccato-Intermezzo
 Suedland-Express
 Sweety
 Tearoom-Story
 Tristy
 Trompeten-Ballade
 Valsette Parsienne
 Velocipede-Boogie
 Wolkenjagd

Music for cinema, documentaries, and television 
 Nanga Parbat 1936, Film footage of the German Himalaya-Expedition 1934
 Kampf um den Himalaya 1938. Film footage of the German Nanga Parbat-Expedition 1937
 An den Wassern Kaschmirs, 1938. Documentary
 Fahrt ins Leben 1940. Film of prewar sea cadets and life at sea. Directed by Bernd Hofmann
 Henkel, ein deutsches Werk in seiner Arbeit. Directed by Walter Ruttmann, 1938
 Die wundersame Schustersfrau, Television play after García Lorca. Directed by Werner Schlechte
 Kolportage 1957. Comedy by Georg Kaiser. Television play directed by Hans Lietzau
 Viktoria. 1957 film after a novel by Knut Hamsun. Directed by Frank Lothar
 Die Kleinbürger. after Maxim Gorki 1996 Television remake by Werner Schlechte.
 Das Glück sucht seine Kinder. 1955. Television play after the novella „Der silberne Krug“ (Jug of Silver) by Truman Capote. Directed by Heinz Schimmelpfennig
 Schatzgräbergeschichten. 1969 by Werner Bergengruen
 Der Spazierstock. 1955 Television play by Michael Sayers. directed by Karl Peter Biltz

External links 
 http://212.96.130.213/hirenew/composers/s.html
 https://web.archive.org/web/20070929142328/http://www.swr.de/swr2/donaueschingen/archiv/programm/1954/index.html
 http://www.filmevona-z.de/filmsuche.cfm?sucheNach=Musik&wert=55511
 

1911 births
1969 deaths
People from Prudnik
20th-century German composers